Anthony Étrillard (born 21 March 1993) is a French rugby union player. His position is hooker and he currently plays for Toulon in the Top 14.

References

External links
Toulon profile
L'Équipe profile
Ligue Nationale De Rugby Profile
European Professional Club Rugby Profile

1993 births
Living people
French rugby union players
RC Toulonnais players
Rugby union hookers
Sportspeople from Bayonne
France international rugby union players